Andersonia is an unincorporated community in Mendocino County, California.

History 

A small wharf was completed at Bear Harbor in 1884 for loading of forest products from the Lost Coast.  In 1893 construction commenced on the Bear Harbor and Eel River Railroad over the coastal ridge to connect Bear Harbor to South Fork Eel River tributary Indian Creek.  The inland railway terminus was called Moody after Lew Moody constructed a hotel and saloon nearby.

Southern Humboldt Lumber Company camp 10 sawmill was built in 1903, and the location was named Andersonia for company president Henry Neff "Pap" Anderson.  A log pond dam was constructed on Indian Creek where   of timber were stored in preparation for milling.  A  railway extension from Moody to Andersonia was being completed in 1905.

"Pap" was killed by a mill accident on November 6, 1905. Sawmill operation was delayed by litigation following Anderson's death. Mr and Mrs Lilley stayed on as caretakers of the "ghost town"

The mill was almost sold in April 1906 to the Wright Blodgett Company of Saginaw, but the earthquake on April 18 caused the buyer to back out.

In 1921, the mill, equipment, and machinery were all dismantled for storage and the town was officially closed.

Heavy rains in 1925-6 caused the dam to burst sending the twenty-year old logs, down the Eel River.

Andersons' grandsons brought new life to the mill with an Arcata-based "Andersonia Forest Products". The company name changed again to Indian Creek Lumber Company. In 1950, another name change back to Andersonia Forest Products and a new manager, Tom Dimmick, originally from Centralia, Washington, was brought on. Lumber was trucked out over U.S. Route 101 rather than rebuilding the railroad and wharf at Bear Harbor.  The locomotives were preserved in 1962.  The sawmill operated until local timber supplies were exhausted in 1972.

Bear Harbor and Eel River Railroad Locomotives

References

"Tales of the Town Tersely Told" Aberdeen herald. (Aberdeen, Chehalis County, W.T.), 31 July 1905. Chronicling America: Historic American Newspapers. Lib. of Congress.
"Tales of the Town Tersely Told" Aberdeen herald. (Aberdeen, Chehalis County, W.T.), 19 Oct. 1905. Chronicling America: Historic American Newspapers. Lib. of Congress.
"Tales of the Town Tersely Told" Aberdeen herald. (Aberdeen, Chehalis County, W.T.), 25 Dec. 1905. Chronicling America: Historic American Newspapers. Lib. of Congress.
"Tales of the Town Tersely Told" Aberdeen herald. (Aberdeen, Chehalis County, W.T.), 22 Jan. 1906. Chronicling America: Historic American Newspapers. Lib. of Congress.
"Tales of the Town Tersely Told" Aberdeen herald. (Aberdeen, Chehalis County, W.T.), 31 May 1906. Chronicling America: Historic American Newspapers. Lib. of Congress.
"Tales of the Town Tersely Told"Aberdeen herald. (Aberdeen, Chehalis County, W.T.), 25 March 1907. Chronicling America: Historic American Newspapers. Lib. of Congress.
"Gypsy Locomotives don Fort Humboldt" Eureka Times Standard January 30, 1980 Page 14 (https://newspaperarchive.com/ : accessed 13 Oct 2020) 
Borden, Stanley. Bear Harbor & Eel River Railroad The Western Railroader, Booklet 292 Vol 27 No 5 May 1964 (https://www.mendorailhistory.org/ : accessed 14 Oct 2020)
See also:
“Andersonia (Calif.) - Search Results - Digital Collections.” (http://www.berkeley.edu/ : accessed 13 Oct 2020). 

Unincorporated communities in California
Unincorporated communities in Mendocino County, California
Defunct California railroads
Logging railroads in the United States